Jewel Belair Staite (born June 2, 1982) is a Canadian actress. She is known for her roles as Kaylee Frye in the Fox television series Firefly (2002–2003) and its spin-off theatrical film Serenity (2005), and as Jennifer Keller on Sci-Fi Channel's science fiction television series Stargate Atlantis (2007–2009). Staite also starred as Catalina in Space Cases (1996), as "Becca" Fisher in Flash Forward (1996–1997), as Raquel Westbrook in the Canadian drama The L.A. Complex (2012), and as Caroline Swift in AMC's crime drama The Killing (2013–2014). Since 2021, she has starred as Abigail Bianchi in the Canadian legal drama series Family Law.

Early life
Staite was born in White Rock, British Columbia, the youngest of seven children. She has said that she is of British, Irish, French Canadian, and Iroquois ancestry. She began her career in early childhood, working both as a model and, from the age of six, as an actor. She attended Vancouver Film School and developed her stagecraft at the Vancouver Youth Theatre.

Career
Staite's first high profile appearances as a child actor came in television movies such as CBC's Liar, Liar in 1993 (which was later aired on CBS in the United States that same year) and ABC's The Only Way Out. In 1995, she had a key guest-starring role in a third-season episode of The X-Files, "Oubliette".

After appearing on Are You Afraid of the Dark? (1994), Staite's first co-starring role on a television series was as Catalina, the ship's engineer, in the first season of the Nickelodeon science fiction series Space Cases in 1996. This was immediately followed by her role as Rebecca "Becca" Fisher on the 1995–1997 Disney Channel series Flash Forward, a series in which Staite was the co-lead with Ben Foster.

In 2000, she was cast in a main role on the FOX Family Channel drama series Higher Ground. She was also a voice actress in the animated TV series Mummies Alive! and Sabrina: The Animated Series for DIC Entertainment.

Staite played Kaylee Frye in the short-lived television series Firefly and its subsequent 2005 film, Serenity. She wrote a chapter in the book Finding Serenity, called "Kaylee Speaks: Jewel Staite On Firefly". She played the recurring role of Heidi Gotts in the television series Wonderfalls in 2004.

Staite played the role of head medical doctor Jennifer Keller in the Stargate SG-1 spinoff Stargate Atlantis, making her one of three actors from the Firefly series to move on to appear in a Stargate series (the others being Adam Baldwin, who appeared in the episode "Heroes", and Morena Baccarin, who played Adria in the tenth season of SG-1). She replaced Paul McGillion (Dr. Carson Beckett).
In the fifth season of Stargate, her character was changed from recurring status to part of the main cast. Before taking on the role as Dr. Keller, she previously played the Wraith child Ellia in the Stargate Atlantis episode "Instinct". She also appeared in the 2010 Syfy film, Mothman, under direction from Sheldon Wilson.
Also in 2010, Staite guest-starred in an episode of Warehouse 13 as the love interest of Sheldon (played by Sean Maher, who played her love interest in Firefly), and in 2011, she guest-starred on an episode of Supernatural as a former love interest of Sam.

In 2012, Staite was a series regular on The L.A. Complex, in which she portrayed Raquel Westbrook, a struggling actress. The show aired in Canada on CTV and MuchMusic and in the U.S. on The CW.  She also appeared in an episode of The Listener. Staite appeared in 10 episodes of the AMC crime drama, The Killing, as Detective Stephen Holder's girlfriend Caroline Swift, from 2013–2014.

Personal life
Staite was married to actor Matt Anderson from 2003 to 2011. In 2015, she became engaged to her boyfriend Charlie Ritchie. In May she announced she was pregnant with her first child, a boy, who was born on December 9, 2015. She married Charlie Ritchie on July 23, 2016.

Filmography

Film

Television

References

External links

 
 
 

1982 births
Living people
Canadian child actresses
Female models from British Columbia
Canadian film actresses
Canadian television actresses
Canadian voice actresses
People from White Rock, British Columbia
Canadian people of Irish descent
Canadian people of British descent
Canadian people of French descent
Canadian people of Iroquois descent
Actresses from British Columbia
20th-century Canadian actresses
21st-century Canadian actresses